Michael Norris (born 8 October 1979) is an English football manager who is currently the head coach of the Portland Thorns FC in the National Women's Soccer League.

Playing career
Norris played youth football as a goalkeeper for Cramlington Juniors, England Boys Club and York City.

Coaching career
Norris earned his FA Preliminary Licence (now known as the FA Coaching Level 2 Licence) in 1998, as well as his FA Goalkeeper Coaching Level 2 Licence in the same year. He earned his Canada Soccer Coaching B Diploma in 2014, followed by a Coaching A Diploma in 2019.

After settling in Vancouver in 2006, his former goalkeeping coach Simon Smith also arrived in the area. Smith hired Norris to work at the new Simon Smith Goalkeeping Academy. Norris would later on set up his own academy program, Michael Norris Pro Goalkeeping. In 2007, he began coach in Burnaby for youth club Mountain FC, later known as Mountain United FC, where he served until 2014. In 2009, he began working as the goalkeeping coach for the men's and women's football teams of Quest University in Canada. He also served as an assistant coach for the men's team. In 2013, he left to become the goalkeeping coach for the UBC Thunderbirds women's football team at the University of British Columbia, where he worked until 2015. From 2014 to 2016, he worked at the Vancouver Whitecaps FC Academy, serving as the goalkeeping coach for men's and women's youth teams.

In 2014, Norris began working as a goalkeeping coach for various Canadian youth national teams. This included the under-15, under-17, under-20 and under-23 women's teams, as well as the under-17 men's team at the 2019 CONCACAF U-17 Championship. In late 2019, he began working as the set piece and goalkeeping coach for the Canada women's senior national team. The team went on to win the gold medal at the 2020 Olympic Football Tournament.

The following year, Norris joined Portland Thorns FC in the National Women's Soccer League as an assistant coach. The team won the championship in the 2022 season, though coach Rhian Wilkinson resigned at the end of the season. On 9 January 2023, Norris was appointed as head coach of the Portland Thorns.

Personal life
Norris was born in Ashington and grew up in Newcastle upon Tyne. Since 2006 he has lived in Burnaby, British Columbia, with his wife and two daughters.

References

1979 births
Living people
Sportspeople from Ashington
Footballers from Northumberland
English footballers
Association football goalkeepers
English football managers
English expatriate football managers
English women's football managers
Vancouver Whitecaps FC non-playing staff
Portland Thorns FC non-playing staff
Portland Thorns FC coaches
National Women's Soccer League coaches
English expatriate sportspeople in Canada
Expatriate soccer managers in Canada
English expatriate sportspeople in the United States
Expatriate soccer managers in the United States